In mathematics, an alternating factorial is the absolute value of the alternating sum of the first n factorials of positive integers.

This is the same as their sum, with the odd-indexed factorials multiplied by −1 if n is even, and the even-indexed factorials multiplied by −1 if n is odd, resulting in an alternation of signs of the summands (or alternation of addition and subtraction operators, if preferred). To put it algebraically,

or with the recurrence relation

in which af(1) = 1.

The first few alternating factorials are

1, 1, 5, 19, 101, 619, 4421, 35899, 326981, 3301819, 36614981, 442386619, 5784634181, 81393657019 

For example, the third alternating factorial is 1! – 2! + 3!. The fourth alternating factorial is −1! + 2! − 3! + 4! = 19. Regardless of the parity of n, the last (nth) summand, n!, is given a positive sign, the (n – 1)th summand is given a negative sign, and the signs of the lower-indexed summands are alternated accordingly.

This pattern of alternation ensures the resulting sums are all positive integers. Changing the rule so that either the odd- or even-indexed summands are given negative signs (regardless of the parity of n) changes the signs of the resulting sums but not their absolute values.

Miodrag Zivković proved in 1999 that there are only a finite number of alternating factorials that are also prime numbers, since 3612703 divides af(3612702) and therefore divides af(n) for all n ≥ 3612702. , the known primes and probable primes are af(n) for 
n = 3, 4, 5, 6, 7, 8, 10, 15, 19, 41, 59, 61, 105, 160, 661, 2653, 3069, 3943, 4053, 4998, 8275, 9158, 11164 
Only the values up to n = 661 have been proved prime in 2006. af(661) is approximately 7.818097272875 × 101578.

References

 
 Yves Gallot, Is the number of primes  finite?
 Paul Jobling, Guy's problem B43: search for primes of form n!-(n-1)!+(n-2)!-(n-3)!+...+/-1!

Integer sequences
Factorial and binomial topics